Miles Away may refer to:

Miles Away (band), an Australian hardcore punk band
"Miles Away" (John Foxx song)
"Miles Away" (Madonna song)
"Miles Away" (Winger song)
Miles Away (album), an album by Madlib
"Miles Away", a 1999 song by A from 'A' vs. Monkey Kong
"Miles Away", a 2014 song by Philip Selway from Weatherhouse
"Miles Away", a 2015 song by The Maine from American Candy
"Miles Away", a 2019 song by Armin van Buuren from Balance

th:ไมลส์อะเวย์